Keyzur (also Romanized as Keyz̄ūr and Kaizur; also known as Keydūz and Qal‘eh Sefīd) is a village in Beyhaq Rural District, Sheshtomad District, Sabzevar County, Razavi Khorasan Province, Iran. At the 2006 census, its population was 1,241, in 348 families.

References 

Populated places in Sabzevar County